Gonal may refer to:

 a gonadotrophic hormone secreted by the pituitary gland, see: Follicle-stimulating hormone 
 Gonal F, a brand of gonadotropin preparation
 -gonal, an adjectival ending for polygons

Places
 Gonal, Badami, village in Mangalore Gram Panchayat, Badami Taluka, Bagalkot District, Karnataka, India
 Gonal, Koppal, village in Gangawati Taluka, Koppal District, Karnataka, India
 Gonal, Shahapur, panchayat village in Shahapur Taluka, Yadgir District, Karnataka, India
 Gonal, Shorapur, village in Shorapur Taluka, Yadgir District, Karnataka, India

People
 Sergio Gonal, Argentine comedian at, for example, Videomatch#Characters and skits

See also
 Gonal Number, see Polygonal number
 
 MacDonell
 McDonnell (surname)